Stewart E. Iverson Jr. (born July 16, 1950) is a former Republican party member of the Iowa House of Representatives. He previously served in the Iowa State Senate from the 5th District, where he was majority leader from 1998 until 2006.

Iverson holds a degree in accounting from Buena Vista College.  He was first elected to the Iowa State house in 1990, serving two terms there.

In 1994 he was elected to the Iowa State Senate. He did not run for reelection in 2006.

He was again elected to the state house in 2010.

Sources
Republican bio of Iverson
Iowa legislature bio of Iverson

1950 births
Living people
People from Dows, Iowa
Buena Vista University alumni
Republican Party Iowa state senators
Republican Party members of the Iowa House of Representatives